Asanoa iriomotensis is a bacterium from the genus Asanoa which has been isolated from mangrove soil in Japan.

References 

Micromonosporaceae
Bacteria described in 2005